The Maharashtra Legislature is the bicameral legislature of the Indian state of Maharashtra. The Legislature is composed of:
 
the Maharashtra Legislative Assembly, the lower house,
the Maharashtra Legislative Council, the upper house, and
the Governor of Maharashtra
 
 
Bicameral legislatures
Legislature
State legislatures of India

Head Leaders

Maharashtra Legislature Leaders